Klára Jerneková (14 January 1945 in Brno – 31 July 2003 in Prague), was a Czech actress. Since 1966, she was a successful member of a national drama group in the National Theatre. The actress died on 31 July 2003 due to alcohol and depression which may have been one of the reasons of the cause of her death at an early age.

Filmography

Animated films 
Snow White and the Seven Dwarfs (1937) – Snow White
Cinderella (1950) – Cinderella

Films/Television Dramas 
Domácí víno (1963) – Alena
Bubny (1965) – Karma
Prípad pro zacínajícího kata (1970) – Markéta
 Hrabe Drakula (1971) – Mina Harkerova/Mina Harker
Tajemství prouteného kosíku (1978)
Mí Prazané mi rozumeji (1991)
Hotel Herbich (2000)

References

External links 
 Klára Jerneková's page at the National Theatere
 Klára Jerneková at Czech-Slovak Film Database
 

1945 births
2003 deaths
20th-century Czech actresses
21st-century Czech actresses
Alcohol-related deaths in the Czech Republic
Czech film actresses
Czech stage actresses
Actors from Brno